Kickhams GAC Creggan, founded in 1924, is a Gaelic Athletic Association club from Creggan, County Antrim, Northern Ireland. The club provides Gaelic football, hurling, camogie and ladies football for all age groups from under-10s to senior level.

Creggan host the annual Ulster U21 Club Football Tournament which runs from January to March and is contested by the nine Ulster county champions. The winners receive the Paddy McLarnon Cup.

References

External links
 

1924 establishments in Northern Ireland
Antrim, County Antrim
Gaelic games clubs in County Antrim
Gaelic football clubs in County Antrim